Darrell Kurt Rambis (born February 25, 1958) is a Greek-American former professional basketball player and coach who is a senior basketball adviser for the Los Angeles Lakers of the National Basketball Association (NBA). As a player, he won four NBA championships while playing power forward for the Lakers. Rambis was a key member of the Showtime era Lakers and was extremely popular for his hard-nosed blue collar play. With his trademark black horn-rimmed glasses, Rambis complemented the flashy Hollywood style of the Showtime era Lakers.

Rambis played college basketball for the Santa Clara Broncos. As a senior in 1980, he was named the player of the year in the West Coast Conference (WCC). Rambis was selected by the New York Knicks in the third round of the 1980 NBA draft, but began his career in Greece with AEK Athens before joining the Lakers. He also played for the Charlotte Hornets, Phoenix Suns, and Sacramento Kings. Rambis became a coach and has served as head coach for the Lakers, Minnesota Timberwolves, and the Knicks. He also won two league championships as an assistant coach with the Lakers.

Biography

Rambis was born in Terre Haute, Indiana. His family moved to Cupertino, California in his preschool years; his number is retired at Cupertino High School. He graduated from Santa Clara University, where he played from 1976 to 1980, becoming its second-leading rebounder and all-time leading scorer with 1,736 points. During his Santa Clara years, he was awarded the WCC Freshman of the Year and Conference Player of the Year as a senior. His No. 34 was retired on December 29, 2008.

Playing career
Rambis was drafted by the New York Knicks as the 58th pick in the 1980 NBA draft, but he was subsequently waived by the Knicks. He played in Greece in the Greek League for the club AEK Athens, under the name Kyriakos Rambidis. Being of Greek descent, he also acquired Greek citizenship. AEK won the Greek Cup in 1981.

He was re-signed by the Knicks in 1981 but never played a game for them. His success as an NBA player started when he was signed as a free agent by the Los Angeles Lakers in 1981. Rambis spent most of his 14 seasons in the NBA with the Lakers, winning championships in 1982, 1985, 1987, and 1988 as part of their Showtime teams.

During his playing days, Rambis was a favorite among the Lakers fans because of his status as an overachieving underdog and ultimate team player. Known for his defensive and rebounding skills, he was remembered in Los Angeles for his all-out effort and willingness to do the "dirty work" that many players do not embrace. Rambis usually wore a thick moustache and thick-rimmed black glasses, prompting Lakers announcer Chick Hearn to nickname him "Superman" (in reference to the character's alter ego, Clark Kent). At the Lakers home arena a "Superman" fan club (also known as Rambis youth) was formed where the courtside spectators wore glasses styled similar to the ones used by Rambis. Lakers head coach Pat Riley once complained to a reporter "Other guys have sharp Adidas bags. [Rambis]'s got this black satchel, like the kind you would have a bowling ball in. And it's, like, vinyl. He doesn't ever bring a garment bag or a suitcase. That's all he ever brings, could be a week."

Rambis also played for the Charlotte Hornets, Phoenix Suns, and Sacramento Kings before returning to the Lakers for the 1993–94 season. He retired as a player with the Lakers in 1995.

Coaching career

Los Angeles Lakers (1994–2009)
Rambis began working as a special assistant coach for the Lakers in 1994 but eventually returned to the active playing roster in February 1995. He was waived at the beginning of the 1995–96 season and resumed his role as an assistant. He served as head coach of the Lakers during the 1999 "lockout season" after coach Del Harris was fired. He achieved moderate success, registering a 24–13 record in the regular season before being swept by the San Antonio Spurs in the 1999 Western Conference Semifinals. When Phil Jackson was hired as head coach, Rambis served as the Lakers' assistant general manager. He later became an assistant coach under Jackson between 2001 and 2004, helping the Lakers reach the 2002 and the 2004 NBA Finals, with Los Angeles winning a title in the former series. He was hired again as an assistant in 2005, along with former player Brian Shaw, helping the Lakers to another pair of finals in 2008 and 2009. The Lakers won in the latter attempt.

Minnesota Timberwolves (2009–2011)
In 2007, Rambis interviewed for the Sacramento Kings' coaching job. He was a finalist again in 2009 to coach the Kings, and after serious discussions, he was offered the job, but he wanted more than a two-year contract and more money than was offered, so he turned down the job.

On August 8, 2009, Rambis was announced as the new head coach for the Minnesota Timberwolves, agreeing to a contract believed to be for 4 years and worth $8 million. Rambis succeeded Kevin McHale, infamous for taking him down in Game 4 of the 1984 NBA Finals.

On July 12, 2011, Rambis was fired as coach of the Minnesota Timberwolves after compiling a 32–132 record in two seasons with the team.

Return to the Lakers (2013–2014)
On July 29, 2013, the Lakers announced they had re-hired Rambis as an assistant coach.

New York Knicks (2014–2018)
On July 7, 2014, the Knicks announced they had hired Rambis to be the assistant head coach of the team under head coach Derek Fisher. On February 8, 2016, Rambis was named the interim head coach after Fisher was fired. After going 9-19 under Rambis, and finishing the season 32–50 overall, the Knicks decided to hire Jeff Hornacek as the team's new head coach, while Rambis was retained as associate head coach. On April 12, 2018, Rambis was fired along with Hornacek, who went 60–104 over two seasons with the Knicks.

Executive career

Los Angeles Lakers (2018–present) 
In September 2018, Rambis rejoined the Lakers as a senior basketball adviser. Rambis has become "one of the most influential members of the organization since returning to the franchise in 2017." Kurt Rambis's wife, Linda Rambis, serves as the Lakers Executive Director of Special Projects and is one of Jeanie Buss's longtime friends. Alongside Rob Pelinka, the couple has been described as "a pillar of the club’s four-pronged brain trust alongside [Jeanie] Buss."

Outside basketball
Rambis also had a recurring role as Coach Cleary in the family drama 7th Heaven. He also guest-starred in season one of Sweet Valley High in episode thirteen "Club X" as a friend of Elizabeth and an episode of The Commish as a basketball player. He appeared in the "Going Places" episode (as himself) of It's Garry Shandling's Show. Rambis also made a cameo appearance in an episode of Malcolm & Eddie.

Head coaching record 

|-
| style="text-align:left;"|L.A. Lakers
| style="text-align:left;"|
|37||24||13|||| style="text-align:center;"|2nd in Pacific||8||3||5||
| style="text-align:center;"|Lost in Conf. Semifinals
|-
| style="text-align:left;"|Minnesota
| style="text-align:left;"|
|82||15||67|||| style="text-align:center;"|5th in Northwest||—||—||—||—
| style="text-align:center;"|Missed Playoffs
|-
| style="text-align:left;"|Minnesota
| style="text-align:left;"|
|82||17||65|||| style="text-align:center;"|5th in Northwest||—||—||—||—
| style="text-align:center;"|Missed Playoffs
|-
| style="text-align:left;"|New York
| style="text-align:left;"|
|28||9||19|||| style="text-align:center;"|3rd in Atlantic||—||—||—||—
| style="text-align:center;"|Missed Playoffs
|- class="sortbottom"
| style="text-align:left;"|Career
| ||229||65||164|||| ||8||3||5||

References

External links

 
 

1958 births
Living people
AEK B.C. players
American expatriate basketball people in Greece
American men's basketball players
American people of Greek descent
Basketball coaches from California
Basketball coaches from Indiana
Basketball players from California
Basketball players from Indiana
Charlotte Hornets players
Greek basketball coaches
Greek men's basketball players
Los Angeles Lakers assistant coaches
Los Angeles Lakers head coaches
Los Angeles Lakers players
Minnesota Timberwolves head coaches
New York Knicks assistant coaches
New York Knicks draft picks
New York Knicks head coaches
People from Cupertino, California
Phoenix Suns players
Power forwards (basketball)
Sacramento Kings players
Santa Clara Broncos men's basketball players
Sportspeople from Santa Clara County, California
Sportspeople from Terre Haute, Indiana